International American University (IAU) is a private, for-profit university of higher learning offering programs through both distance education and classroom instruction.  The university started operations in 2005 in Los Angeles, as the Management Institute of America, Inc. It currently operates from facilities in Palmdale, California and Los Angeles, California.

In July 2006, it acquired approval to operate by the California Bureau for Private Postsecondary and Vocational Education (BPPVE) to grant degrees under the provisions of the California Education Code, Section 94900. In January 2010, the California Bureau for Private Postsecondary Education (BPPE) replaced the Bureau for Private Postsecondary and Vocational Education. IAU is currently licensed by the BPPE.

In December 2011, IAU received its full re-approval to operate by the State of California Bureau for Private Postsecondary Education (BPPE) to grant degrees under the provisions of the California Education Code. The approval is valid for 5 years from December 15, 2011 – December 14, 2016.

Degree programs
According to its catalog and its website, IAU offers Certificate, A.A., Bachelor's, Masters, and Doctoral Degree Programs.

Leadership
Dr. Stephen Tvorik was appointed as the President of IAU in March 2010.

Dr. Langvardt serves as the Dean of Academic Affairs at IAU. He joined IAU as a member of the adjunct faculty in 2008.

History

IAU started operations in 2005 in Los Angeles as the Management Institute of America. It currently operates from facilities in Palmdale, California and Los Angeles, California. According to its newsletter, the university received its initial approval for the name change on July 6, 2006, and conducted its first graduation ceremony in Malaysia on April 1, 2007. This was only 8 months after its temporary approval. During its commencement ceremony, 85 students received their degrees.

March 2009: IAU received its approval by the United States Immigration and Customs Enforcement (ICE) of the Department of Homeland Security (DHS) to accept and enroll foreign, non-immigrant F-1 students for academic degrees.

January 2008: IAU relocated its administrative office from Los Angeles to Palmdale, CA. IAU establishes CAS Academy, a department under the School of Business and Technology.

September 2006: Management Institute of America, Inc. legally changed its name to the International American University.

July 2006: Management Institute of America, Inc sought California State approval to legally change its name to the International American University (IAU) in 2006.

August 2005: Management Institute of America, Inc. is incorporated in the State of California as a private proprietary corporation, duly formed and organized under the laws and regulations of the Secretary of State for the State of California.

Accreditation status
International American University's website states that it is legally operating in California as an educational institution authorized to grant all degrees and/or offer credentials as indicated on its website / catalog. According to the university, it has a governing board with legal and fiduciary responsibility to exercise appropriate oversight over institutional integrity, policies, resource development, and ongoing operations. The university was approved on March 6, 2009, by the United States Immigration and Customs Enforcement (ICE) to accept and enroll foreign, non-immigrant F-1 students for academic degrees.

International American University received Candidacy by the Transnational Association of Christian Colleges and Schools on November 5, 2019. According to TRACS, "Candidacy (pre-accreditation) indicates that the institution is in basic compliance with the Standards and Criteria, has been evaluated by an on-site peer team, and in the professional judgment of the evaluation team and the Accreditation Commission, the institution provides sound instruction and student services. While candidacy indicates that an institution appears to have the potential to achieve accreditation within the prescribed five-year period, this level of recognition does not guarantee the institution will become accredited." TRACS is recognized by the United States Department of Education or the Council for Higher Education Accreditation (CHEA).

On October 26, 2020, International American University was awarded Accredited Status as a Category IV institution by the TRACS Accreditation Commission; this status is effective for a period of five (5) years. TRACS is recognized by the United States Department of Education, the Council for Higher Education Accreditation and the International Network for Quality Assurance Agencies in Higher Education (INQAAHE).

References

External links
 Official IAU website

2005 establishments in California
Unaccredited institutions of higher learning in California